Krautreporter is a German news website that has been online since October 2014. The financing of the platform was done by crowdfunding. This is to guarantee independent journalism without advertising. It was inspired by the Dutch news website, De Correspondent from the Netherlands, founded in 2013. Krautreporter publishes primarily long in-depth articles on various topics.

References

External links
 

2014 establishments in Germany
Crowdfunded journalism
German-language magazines
German-language websites
News magazines published in Germany
German news websites
Magazines established in 2014
Online magazines